Suru may refer to:

 Suru, Estonia, village in Estonia
 Suru, Bushehr, village in Bushehr Province, Iran
 Suru, Hormozgan, village in Hormozgan Province, Iran
 Suru, Kerman, village in Kerman Province, Iran
 Suru, Nigeria, Local Government Area in Kebbi State, Nigeria
 Suru River (Boia), headwater of the Boia Mică River in Romania
 Suru River (Indus), tributary of the Indus River in India
 Suru Valley, valley in the Ladakh region of Jammu and Kashmir
 Casuarina equisetifolia, a type of sheoak